Baudour is a village of Wallonia and a district of the municipality of Saint-Ghislain, located in the province of Hainaut, Belgium.

Notable inhabitants 
Henri Delmotte and Michel Daerden were born in Baudour

Gallery 

Former municipalities of Hainaut (province)